Alfeizerão is a freguesia ("civil parish") in the municipality of Alcobaça, Portugal. The population in 2011 was 3,854, in an area of 27.99 km².

References

Freguesias of Alcobaça, Portugal